The Matang Highway is a 2-lane, dual-carriage expressway located in the Malaysian state of Sarawak, on the island of Borneo. Construction commenced in July 2002 and was targeted for completion by December 2008. The construction cost about 201,000,000 Ringgit. As of 2010, the highway provides a direct route from Kuching to Lundu.

References

Highways in Malaysia